Les Jazz Modes is an album by Les Jazz Modes, a group led by french horn player Julius Watkins and saxophonist Charlie Rouse. It was recorded in 1956 and released on the Dawn label. The album was released on CD with additional tracks from Jazzville Vol. 1 (Dawn, 1956) and Modern Jazz Festival (Jazztone, 1956)

Reception

AllMusic awarded the album 4 stars.

Track listing
All compositions by Julius Watkins except as indicated, all arrangements by Julius Watkins.
 "Dancing on the Ceiling" (Lorenz Hart, Richard Rodgers) -2:26 Bonus track on CD reissue		
 "Legend" (Gildo Mahones) - 3:17 Bonus track on CD reissue		
 "Temptations" (Nacio Herb Brown, Arthur Freed) - 3:57 Bonus track on CD reissue		
 "Episode" - 2:05 Bonus track on CD reissue		
 "Dancing in the Dark" (Howard Dietz, Arthur Schwartz) - 2:05 Bonus track on CD reissue		
 Goodbye" (Gordon Jenkins) - 3:41 Bonus track on CD reissue		
 "Town and Country" (Varon) - 4:16		
 "When the Blues Come On"  (Al Cohn, Charles Isaiah Darwin) - 4:15		
 "Blue Modes" - 4:30		
 "You Are Too Beautiful" (Hart, Rodgers) - 3:43		
 "So Far" (Oscar Hammerstein II, Rodgers) - 2:56
 "Idle Evening" - 4:16
 "Garden Delights" - 5:28		
 "Strange Tale" - 4:30		
 "Two Songs" - 3:13		
 "Stallion" (Mahones) - 3:04 Bonus track on CD reissue

Personnel
Julius Watkins - French horn
Charlie Rouse - tenor saxophone
Gildo Mahones - piano 
Paul West (tracks 1-6), Paul Chambers (tracks 7-10, 13, 15 & 16), Oscar Pettiford (tracks 11, 12 & 14) - bass
Art Taylor (tracks 1-6), Ron Jefferson (tracks 7-16) - drums
Janet Putnam - harp (tracks 8 & 10))
Eileen Gilbert - vocals (tracks 8, 10 & 14)

References

1957 albums
Charlie Rouse albums
Julius Watkins albums